Joffre's bat (Mirostrellus joffrei), also known as Joffre's pipistrelle, is a species of vesper bat in the family Vespertilionidae. It is the only member of the genus Mirostrellus.  It is found in South and Southeast Asia.

It was formerly classified in the genus Hypsugo, but phylogenetic studies indicate that it belongs in its own genus, which was described in 2020 as Mirostrellus. The studies also found Anthony's pipistrelle (H. anthonyi), a mysterious bat known from a single specimen, collected at Changyinku, Burma, at 7000 ft (2134 m) altitude, to be conspecific with M. joffrei.

References

Vesper bats
Mammals of Myanmar
Mammals described in 1915
Taxonomy articles created by Polbot
Taxa named by Oldfield Thomas
Bats of Asia
Taxobox binomials not recognized by IUCN